Baby-faced Assassin may refer to:

Sports

Combat sports
Josh Barnett, American heavyweight mixed martial arts fighter and professional wrestler
Marco Antonio Barrera, seven-time world champion boxer
Paul Butler (boxer), British professional boxer
Shannon Courtenay, British professional boxer
Jimmy McLarnin, two-time welterweight boxing champion
Daniel Roman (boxer), professional boxer
Johnny Tapia (1967–2012), boxer

Other sports
Bill Corbus (1911–1998), American football player
Stephen Curry, American professional basketball player for the Golden State Warriors
Karim Abdel Gawad, Egyptian squash player
Fergal O'Brien, Irish snooker player
Endicott Peabody, known as Chub Peabody, Harvard footballer and later politician
Wayne Rooney, English football player
Ole Gunnar Solskjær, Norwegian former footballer

Others
Endicott Peabody, known as Chub Peabody, Harvard footballer and later politician
Gavin Williamson, British Conservative politician